Arlington is a small farming town in the Free State province of South Africa. It was established as an important railway link between Lindley and Senekal.

Geography and layout
Arlington (like all Free State towns) features a racially segregated geography due to the policies of apartheid. This is evidenced by the fact that the white population live in the actual town of Arlington while the non-white (almost exclusively black) community lives in the neighboring township of Leratswana, which is currently being greatly extended.

Transport

Railway 
Arlington is vital for its railway location. It lies at the junction of two railway lines, one stretching from Lindley to Senekal, and another connecting Bethlehem and Steynsrus.

Road
Arlington lies on the R707, which actually separates Arlington from Leratswana. This road connects the towns of Lindley and Senekal.

References

Populated places in the Nketoana Local Municipality
Populated places founded by Afrikaners